Harpers Ferry was a live music venue and bar in the Allston neighborhood of Boston, Massachusetts. It was in the high traffic central student section of Boston, equidistant from both Boston College and Boston University. Hosting national touring acts and regional acts, Harpers Ferry became known as "Boston's Best Live Music". The development of the "Allston Rock City" music scene centered on Harpers Ferry as a primary venue. Harpers Ferry closed down unexpectedly on October 31, 2010. The location is now home to the Brighton Music Hall.

History 
Harpers Ferry had a reputation throughout the Boston area as being an important venue in the hardcore music scene. After the closure of The Rathskeller, a famous venue in Kenmore Square, many of the hardcore bands that called The Rat home moved to The Middle East in the Central Square scene in Cambridge, Massachusetts or to Harpers Ferry.

The WBCN Rock & Roll Rumble was held at Harpers Ferry in 2007 and 2008.

On March 17, 2007, Dropkick Murphys performed their 2007 St. Patrick's Day show at Harpers Ferry.

Years ago blues and rhythm and blues music was featured prominently at the club, including a yearly blues festival in February and an annual Battle of the Blues Bands.

Harpers Ferry abruptly closed in October 2010 following an unresolved dispute between the club's general manager and the landlord. Several months of performances were cancelled so the club could close.

Notable musical performances 

The following have performed at Harpers Ferry:

Fall Out Boy
James Cotton
Chiddy Bang
Buddy Guy
Sleepy LaBeef
Bo Diddley
Johnny Winter
Matt "Guitar" Murphy
Dropkick Murphys
Gym Class Heroes
Sister Hazel
Miike Snow
Converge
Everybody Out!
The Unseen
Zox
MxPx
3OH!3
Street Dogs
Jay Reatard
Catch 22
Darkbuster
Andrew W.K
Lazlo Hollyfeld
The Ducky Boys
Fishbone
The Casualties
K'Naan
Roger Clyne
Assembly of Dust
The Receiving End of Sirens
Zac Brown Band
Susan Tedeschi
Little Feat

References

External links
Official website
Harpers Ferry Myspace

Music venues in Boston
Nightclubs in Massachusetts
Punk rock venues
Drinking establishments in Boston
Former music venues in the United States
Defunct nightclubs in the United States
2010 disestablishments in Massachusetts